Willema perexcellens is a species of butterfly in the family Hesperiidae. It is found in Malawi and Tanzania.

Subspecies
Willema perexcellens perexcellens -Malawi: Kasungu Mountain
Willema perexcellens marunga Evans, 1937 - Tanzania: Marung Plateau
Willema perexcellens sitebi Kielland, 1982 - Tanzania: Mpanda district

References

Butterflies described in 1896
Heteropterinae
Butterflies of Africa
Taxa named by Arthur Gardiner Butler